Spilarctia philippinica is a moth in the family Erebidae. It was described by Vladimir Viktorovitch Dubatolov and Yasunori Kishida in 2010. It is found on Luzon and Negros in the Philippines.

Subspecies
Spilarctia philippinica philippinica (Philippines: Luzon)
Spilarctia philippinica negrosica Dubatolov & Kishida, 2010 (Philippines: Negros)

References

  & , 2010: Praephragmatobia gen. nov., a new subgenus of the Spilarctia strigatula group, with a preliminary review of species (Lepidoptera: Arctiidae). Tinea 21 (2): 98–111. Full article: 

P
Endemic fauna of the Philippines
Moths of the Philippines
Moths described in 2010